Tourism in Madhya Pradesh has been an attraction of India because of its location in the centre of the country. Madhya Pradesh has won Best Tourism State National award for 3 consecutive years i.e. 2017, 2016 and 2015.

Natural environment 

The natural environment of Madhya Pradesh is varied. Consisting largely of a plateau streaked with the mountain ranges of the Vindhyas and the Satpuras, the hills give rise to the main river system - Narmada and the Tapti, running from east to west, and the Chambal, Sone, Betwa, Mahanadi west to east.

One half of the state is forested and offers a unique panorama of wildlife. In the National Parks of Kanha, Bandhavgarh, Shivpuri and many others visitors have the opportunity to see the tiger, the bison and a wide variety of deer and antelope in natural surroundings.

World heritage sites 

Although the modern state of Madhya Pradesh came into being in 1956, its cultural heritage is ancient and chequered. Innumerable monuments, exquisitely carved temples, stupas, forts and palaces on hilltops, raise in the visitors mind visions of empires and kingdoms, of the great warriors and builders, poets and musicians, saints and philosophers; of Hinduism, Buddhism, and Jainism. The famous Sanskrit poet-dramatist Kalidasa and the great musician of the Mughal court, Tansen, were from Madhya Pradesh. They are known all over the world.

Three sites in Madhya Pradesh have been declared World Heritage Sites by UNESCO:
 The Khajuraho Group of Monuments (1986)
 Buddhist Monuments at Sanchi (1989)
 The Rock Shelters of Bhimbetka (2003)
The city of Gwalior and Orchha(2020) ( Not included as a world heritage site, pilot cities for the Historic Urban Landscape programme and survey  )

Significant sites 

Other architecturally significant or scenic sites include:

 Alampur
 Amarkantak
 Asirgarh
 Bawangaja
 Bhopal
 Chanderi
 Chitrakuta
 Deorkothar
 Dhar
 Gwalior
 Indore
 Jabalpur
 Maheshwar
 Mandleshwar
 Mandu
 Morena
 Muktagiri
 Narsinghgarh
 Omkareshwar
 Orchha
 Sailana
 Shivpuri
 Sonagiri 
 Ujjain
Madhya Pradesh being very large geographically, and the history being spread over several millennia, a developing a comprehensive picture of heritage and architecture is a monumental task.

National Parks 

Madhya Pradesh is home to several National Parks, including:
 Bandhavgarh National Park
 Kanha National Park
 Satpura National Park
 Sanjay National Park
 Madhav National Park
 Van Vihar National Park
 Mandla Plant Fossils National Park
 Panna National Park
 Pench National Park, Madhya Pradesh.
White Tiger Safari & Zoo, Mukundpur, Madhya Pradesh
 National Chambal Sanctuary

There are 10 national parks and 25 wildlife sanctuaries in Madhya Pradesh. Apart from tiger, the national parks in Madhya Pradesh have animals like Leopard, Gaur, Chital, Sambar, Nilgai, Chinkara, Barking Deer, Barasingha, Samber Deer, Wild Boar, Monkey, Peacock, etc.

Nature reserves 

There are also a number of nature preserves, including:
 Pachmarhi
 Amarkantak
 Bagh Caves
 Bhedaghat
 Bori Wildlife Sanctuary
 Kuno-Palpur Wildlife Sanctuary
 Narwar
 Chambal
 Narsinghgarh
 Patalkot
Parsili

Fairs and festivals 

Customs and beliefs in each area in Madhya Pradesh have added colours to the fairs and festivals. Shivratri in Khajuraho, Bhojpur, Pachmarhi and Ujjain; Dusshera in Jabalpur, Ramanavami in Chitrakoot and Orchha, Bhagoriya dance in Jhabua and the annual festival of dances at Khajuraho are events for the tourists to remember. The Malwa festival in Indore, Mandu and Ujjain, and the Pachmarhi festival bring alive the rich folk and tribal culture of the state in colourful celebrations.
Gwalior trade fair is India's second largest trade fair. It is organised in various sectors which includes electronic sector, automobile sector, food sector, fun (jhula) sector etc.
Gwalior carnival is a newly introduced festival in 2012. It was organised for 22 days in December. It is planned to organise carnival every year. Nimar Utsav takes place every year in the holy city of Maheshwar in the Hindu month of Kartika on the occasion of Kartika Purnima. The festival lasts for 3 days with a cultural programme at Ahilya Ghat in Maheshwar.

Hill stations
 Panchmarhi
 Amarkantak
 Shivpuri

Gallery

Tourist attractions places
1) Kitni Dam

Kutni Dam is a multipurpose river canal project on Kutni river situated in Khajwa, Madhya Pradesh, India.It is the largest dam in Chhatarpur district.The dam across the Kutni river and it is 7 km from Rajnagar, 12 km from Khajuraho and 40 km from Chhatarpur District.The dam is famous for its beauty and vastness.

See also

 Tourism in North East India
 List of Protected areas of Madhya Pradesh

References

External links